Manish Goplani is an Indian actor. He is known for his portrayal of Bihaan Pandey in Thapki Pyaar Ki.

Career
Goplani started off by playing Rajbeer in the Zee Marudhara series Chora Tera Gaon Bada Pyaara opposite Jigyasa Singh. His breakthrough came when his portrayal of Bihaan Pandey and Aryan Khanna from 2015 to 2017 in Colors TV's Thapki Pyar Ki, his second consecutive show with Singh, gave him a household name.

In 2016, he played a cameo role in Yeh Vaada Raha on Zee TV. From 2017 to 2018, Goplani acted as Bhim Singh Bhullar in Detective Didi opposite Sonia Balani. He then appeared in the comedy sitcom Belan Wali Bahu as Lallan. 

In 2019, he portrayed Ghoonghru/Kshitij Agarwal/Krish Asthana in Zee TV's Aap Ke Aa Jane Se. From 2019 to 2020 Goplani played Dr. Saahas Banerjee in Bepanah Pyaar opposite Ishita Dutta.

Television

References

External links 

Male actors from Jaipur
Male actors from Rajasthan
Indian male television actors
Living people
1992 births
Male actors in Hindi television